Spottswood William Robinson III (July 26, 1916 – October 11, 1998) was an American educator, civil rights attorney, and a United States circuit judge of the United States Court of Appeals for the District of Columbia Circuit after previously serving as a United States district judge of the United States District Court for the District of Columbia.

Education and career

Born in Richmond, Virginia, the son of Spottswood William Robinson II [1893-1954], a lawyer, and Inez Irene Clements [1893-1994], a homemaker, Robinson an undergraduate degree from Virginia Union University and a Bachelor of Laws from Howard University School of Law in 1939, graduating first in his class and achieving the highest scholastic average in the history of the law school. He was a member of the faculty of Howard University School of Law from 1939 to 1948. He was in private practice of law in Richmond from 1943 to 1960. He was counsel and representative for the Virginia NAACP Legal Defense and Educational Fund from 1948 to 1950. He was southeast regional counsel for the NAACP from 1951 to 1960. He was Professor and Dean of Howard University School of Law from 1960 to 1963. He was a member of the United States Commission on Civil Rights from 1961 to 1963.

NAACP LDF cases

In the early 1950s, Robinson and his law-partner Oliver Hill, working through the NAACP Legal Defense Fund, litigated several civil rights lawsuits in Virginia. In 1951, Robinson and Hill took up the cause of the African-American students at the segregated R.R. Moton High School in Farmville, Virginia who had walked out of their dilapidated school. The subsequent lawsuit, Davis v. County School Board of Prince Edward County, was consolidated with four other cases decided under Brown v. Board of Education by the Supreme Court of the United States in 1954. In his arguments before the Court, Robinson made the first argument on behalf of the plaintiffs. Robinson also participated in Chance v. Lambeth, which invalidated carrier-enforced racial segregation in interstate transportation.

Federal judicial service

Robinson received a recess appointment from President Lyndon B. Johnson on January 6, 1964, to a seat on the United States District Court for the District of Columbia vacated by Judge James Ward Morris. He was nominated to the same seat by President Johnson on February 3, 1964. He was confirmed by the United States Senate on July 1, 1964, and received his commission on July 2, 1964, becoming the first African-American to serve on this court. His service was terminated on November 8, 1966, due to elevation to the D.C. Circuit.

Robinson was nominated by President Johnson on October 6, 1966, to a seat on the United States Court of Appeals for the District of Columbia Circuit vacated by Judge George Thomas Washington. He was confirmed by the Senate on October 20, 1966, and received his commission on November 3, 1966. He served as Chief Judge from 1981 to 1986, becoming the first African-American to both serve on this court and serve as Chief Judge of the court. He assumed senior status on September 1, 1989. His service was terminated on October 11, 1998, due to his death in Richmond.

Notable case

Robinson's opinion in Canterbury v. Spence is credited with requiring medical doctors to secure informed consent and as the beginning of a more litigious medical culture.

See also 
 List of African-American federal judges
 List of African-American jurists

References

External links 

|-

|-

1916 births
1998 deaths
20th-century American judges
African-American history of Virginia
African-American judges
Activists for African-American civil rights
American civil rights lawyers
American legal scholars
Howard University School of Law alumni
Howard University School of Law faculty
Judges of the United States Court of Appeals for the D.C. Circuit
Judges of the United States District Court for the District of Columbia
Deans of law schools in the United States
Lawyers from Richmond, Virginia
United States court of appeals judges appointed by Lyndon B. Johnson
United States district court judges appointed by Lyndon B. Johnson
Virginia lawyers
Virginia Union University alumni